The National Museum of the Democratic Republic of Congo (French: Musée national de la République démocratique du Congo) or MNRDC is a museum for the cultural history of the numerous ethnic groups and historical epochs of the Democratic Republic of the Congo in the capital Kinshasa. It was officially handed over to the Congolese government by representatives of the Republic of Korea in June 2019.

The construction cost of US-$21 million was funded by the Korean Agency for Cooperation (KOICA). The building was built after a construction period of 33 months in cooperation between experts of the DR Congo and the Republic of Korea under modern aspects (locally available construction materials, use of solar energy, natural air circulation with only partial use of air conditioning, etc.) and represents the largest cultural policy investment of South Korea in Central Africa to date.

In three public exhibition halls of 6,000 m2, 12,000 objects can be presented in their cultural context. The majority of the holdings of the National Institute of Museums (Institut des Musées Nationaux du Congo), however, must be stored in depots. Unlike in the past, when the director and scientific cooperation had been provided for decades by Belgian scientists from the Africa Museum in Brussels, Congolese experts have now been trained in South Korea. Thus, the Congolese cultural politicians have put their international cooperation on a broader basis than before.

The museum was opened to the public on 23 November 2019 by the President of the DR Congo, Félix Tshisekedi. Referring to requests for the restitution of African cultural heritage from museums in Europe, Tshisekedi said: "We support the return of the scattered cultural heritage, especially in Belgium. The idea is there, but it needs to be done gradually. Of course it is a Congolese heritage, one day it will be necessary that this heritage is returned, but it has to be done in an organized way. It requires means for the upkeep. One thing is to ask for their return, but another is to conserve it."

See also 

 Culture of the Democratic Republic of the Congo - Traditional cultural heritage and contemporary fine art 
 Democratic Republic of the Congo
 Report on the restitution of African cultural heritage

Further reading 

 Van Beurden, Sarah. (2005) Authentically African. Arts and the Transnational Politics of Congolese Culture. Ohio University Press, Athens, Ohio, .

References 

National museums
Ethnographic museums in Africa
Museums established in 2019
2019 establishments in Africa
Buildings and structures in Kinshasa
African art museums
Museums in the Democratic Republic of the Congo
Culture of Kinshasa
Democratic Republic of the Congo–South Korea relations
Lukunga District